Carl Francis Biddiscombe (June 22, 1924 – November 4, 2000) was a Canadian-American set decorator. He was nominated for two Academy Awards in the category Best Art Direction for the films Gaily, Gaily and Tora! Tora! Tora!. Biddiscombe was buried in Pacific View Memorial Park, alongside his wife.

Selected filmography 
Biddiscombe was nominated for two Academy Awards for Best Art Direction:
 Gaily, Gaily (1969; co-nominated with Robert F. Boyle,  George B. Chan and Edward G. Boyle)
 Tora! Tora! Tora! (1970; co-nominated with Jack Martin Smith, Yoshirō Muraki, Richard Day, Taizô Kawashima, Walter M. Scott and Norman Rockett)

References

External links 

1924 births
2000 deaths
People from Saint John, New Brunswick
Canadian emigrants to the United States
American set decorators
Canadian set decorators
Burials at Pacific View Memorial Park